Antonio Cariglia (28 March 1924 – 20 February 2010) was an Italian politician.

Biography
A graduate in political and social sciences, Cariglia was an MP and MEP several times between the 1960s and the 1990s for the Italian Democratic Socialist Party (PSDI), of which he was secretary from 1988 to 1992, when he became president of the party.

In 1993, he was arrested at the behest of magistrates investigating the Mani pulite corruption scandal: among the charges he faced were those of extortion, receiving stolen goods, and illicit financing. Cariglia was fully acquitted from all of these accusations after a court case that lasted twelve years.

In 2004 he was appointed Honorary President of the reborn Italian Democratic Socialist Party.

He died in 2010, at the age of 85.

References

1924 births
2010 deaths
20th-century Italian politicians
Italian Democratic Socialist Party politicians
Members of the Chamber of Deputies (Italy)
Deputies of Legislature IV of Italy
Deputies of Legislature V of Italy
Deputies of Legislature VI of Italy
Deputies of Legislature XI of Italy
Members of the Senate of the Republic (Italy)
Senators of Legislature X of Italy
MEPs for Italy 1979–1984
MEPs for Italy 1989–1994
People from Vieste